Edward Ray Weidlein (July 14, 1887 – August 15, 1983) was a chemist and later Director, Chairman, and President at the Mellon Institute of Industrial Research.  He served as president of the American Chemical Society in 1937 and of the American Institute of Chemical Engineers.  His awards included the Chemical Industry Medal in 1935, the Priestley Medal in 1948 and the AIChE Founders Award for Outstanding Contributions to the Field of Chemical Engineering in 1966.

Weidlein was born in Augusta, Kansas. He studied at the University of Kansas.

References

1887 births
1983 deaths
University of Kansas alumni
20th-century American chemists
People from Augusta, Kansas